The Canada women's national handball team is the national team of Canada. It takes part in international handball competitions. It is governed by the Canadian Team Handball Federation.

The team participated in the 1995 World Women's Handball Championship and in the 1997 World Women's Handball Championship.

Results

Summer Olympics
1976 – 6th

World Championship
1978 – 10–12th
1990 – 15th
1995 – 17–20th
1997 – 20th

Pan American Championship
1986 – 2nd
1989 – 1st
1991 – 2nd
1997 – 2nd
2003 – 5th
2005 – 4th
2007 – 6th
2013 – 9th

Pan American Games
 1987 – 2nd
 1995 – 2nd
 1999 – 2nd
 2007 – 6th
 2011 – 5th
 2015 – 7th
 2019 – 7th

NorCa Championship
 2019 – 7th

Current squad
The squad chosen for the 2019 Pan American Games in Lima, Peru.

Head coach: Nathalie Brochu

References

External links

IHF profile

Handball
Women's national handball teams
National team